Ralph Oliver Patt (5 December 1929 – 6 October 2010) was an American jazz guitarist who introduced major-thirds tuning. Patt's tuning simplified the learning of the fretboard and chords by beginners and improvisation by advanced guitarists. He invented major-thirds tuning under the inspiration of first the atonal music of Arnold Schoenberg and second  the jazz of John Coltrane and Ornette Coleman.

He graduated with a degree in geology from the University of Pittsburgh. After his career as a guitarist, he worked as a geologist and as a hydrologist, often consulting on projects related to the U.S. Department of Energy.

Biography

Patt was born in Kittanning, Pennsylvania on 5 December 1929 and studied  geology at the University of Pittsburgh.

Guitar and music theory
While in Pittsburgh, Patt studied guitar under Joe Negri. Patt played rhythm guitar in the style of Freddie Green, who played a Stromberg in the Count Basie Orchestra. Having earned his baccalaureate degree, he joined the United States Army and played guitar in an Army band. Following his 1955 discharge from the Army, Patt played with touring bands, for example, Neal Hefti, Frankie Carle, Les Elgart, Benny Goodman, Richard Maltby, and The Glenn Miller Orchestra.

After touring for five years, Patt settled in New York City, where he worked as musician both at ABC and on Broadway from 1960 to 1970; during this period he regarded Barry Galbraith as his mentor. He studied under George Russell, whose (1959) Lydian Chromatic Concept of Tonal Organization Patt  edited. Patt also studied with Gunther Schuller, who himself was a student of Arnold Schoenberg and who used Schoenberg's twelve-tone technique for atonal composition. Patt wanted to be able to play and then to improvise twelve-tone music.

Major-thirds tuning

Patt was inspired by the jazz of Ornette Coleman and John Coltrane and the atonal music of Schoenberg. Seeking a guitar tuning that would facilitate improvisation,  he introduced major-thirds tuning by 1964, perhaps in 1963. Patt's tuning is a regular tuning in the sense that all of the intervals between its successive open strings are major thirds; in contrast, the standard guitar tuning has one major third amid four perfect fourths. Patt used major-thirds tuning during all of his work as a session musician after 1965 in New York.

Major-thirds tuning packs the chromatic scale (the consecutive twelve notes of the octave) onto four consecutive frets of three consecutive strings, an arrangement that reduces the extensions of the little and index fingers ("hand stretching"). Major and minor chords are played on two successive frets, and so require only two fingers; other chords—seconds, fourths, sevenths, and ninths—are played on three successive frets.  For each regular tuning,  chord patterns may be moved around the fretboard, a property that simplifies beginners' learning of chords and that simplifies advanced players' improvisation. In contrast, chords cannot be shifted around the fretboard in the standard tuning E-A-D-G-B-E, which requires four chord shapes for the major chords; standard tuning has separate chord forms for chords having their root note on the third, fourth, fifth, and sixth strings.

Having exactly three pitch classes for its open notes (for example {C,E,G}), each major-thirds tuning repeats every note in a higher octave, because guitars have six strings. Being regular, M3 tunings repeat each note after two strings: this repetition simplifies the learning of chords and improvisation. Chord inversion is especially simple in major-thirds tuning. Chords are inverted simply by raising one or two notes three strings. The raised notes are played with the same finger as the original notes.

Guitars with seven and eight strings

Major-thirds tuning has a smaller scope than standard guitar tuning, and so Patt started using seven-string guitars, which enabled major-thirds tuning to have the E−e' range of the standard tuning. He first experimented with a wide-neck Mango guitar from the 1920s, which he modified to have seven strings in 1963. In 1967 he purchased a seven-string by José Rubio. Patt used major-thirds tuning when he performed as a session musician in New York City after 1965.

Later, he purchased six-string archtop hollow-body guitars that were then modified by luthiers to have wider necks, wider pickups, and eight strings. Patt's Gibson ES-150 was modified by Vincent "Jimmy" DiSerio, a luthier who worked in the firm of John D'Angelico, circa 1965. Luthier Saul Koll modified a sequence of guitars: a 1938 Gibson Cromwell, a Sears Silvertone, a circa 1922 Mango archtop, a 1951 Gibson L-50, and a 1932 Epiphone Broadway; for Koll's modifications, custom pickups accommodated Patt's wide necks and high G (equivalently A); custom pickups were manufactured by Seymour Duncan and by Bill Lawrence.

Besides these guitars, Patt regularly played other stringed instruments as a recording musician: classical guitar, 12-string guitar, 6-string bass guitar, mandolin, banjo, and oud. Patt stated that "the only guys that didn't have to double on dates were the Tony Mottolas and the Johnny Smiths"; Tony Mottola and Johnny Smith were famous jazz guitarists, and "doubling" refers to a musician's switching from one instrument to another, particularly within a family of instruments. Patt worked primarily as a studio musician from 1970 to 1975.

Scholarship

Patt developed a webpage with extensive information about major-thirds tuning. This webpage was part of a website with extensive information for jazz guitarists. Patt's website published his Vanilla book, which contains the chord progressions for four hundred jazz standards, from "After you've gone" to "Zing! went the strings". Its title refers to  "Just play the vanilla changes", advice to young pianists from Lester Young. It was updated in 2008.

His website followed earlier contributions to guitar scholarship and instruction. In 1962, Patt wrote his  Guitar chord dictionary (1962). Living in New York City in the 1960s, he studied with Chuck Wayne, with whom he wrote The guitar appreggio dictionary (1965), one of the bestselling titles from the music-publishing firm of Henry Adler.

Return to geology
As a studio musician in the 1970s, Patt had to play less jazz and more rock and roll, and so he changed careers. He returned to geology  while continuing to pursue jazz as an avocation. Around 1975 he began working on his doctoral degree in hydrogeology. Employed by the US Department of Energy, he specialized in groundwater contamination from nuclear waste; as a research hydrogeologist, he accepted assignments worldwide and had extensive travels in Ukraine and Russia.

He was employed by Oregon's Department of Water Resources, where he served as its expert on the risks to the Columbia River from the Hanford Site. As a hydrological geologist (hydrologist), he was appointed to a panel of outside experts that reviewed  and then "slammed" the U.S. Department of Energy's report on the safety of the underground storage of high-level nuclear waste at Hanford.

Death
In  2002 and 2010, Patt's hometown was listed as Canby, Oregon, near Portland. Having been diagnosed with kidney cancer in 2007, Ralph Oliver Patt died at the age of 80 on 6 October 2010 in Canby at home. To honor his memory, the Ralph Patt Memorial Scholarship provided full tuition, room, and board for a college student to attend the Mel Brown Jazz Camp in 2011.

See also

Predecessors of Patt's The vanilla book of chord progressions of jazz standards:
Fake book
Real Book
Free jazz of Ornette Coleman and John Coltrane.
Lists of guitarists, playing
Extended-range guitars
Jazz
Tony Corman's M3 guitar web page

References

Footnotes

Citations

Bibliography

External links
 Ralph Patt, maintained by his friends.

Inventors of musical tunings
Swing guitarists
Mainstream jazz guitarists
American jazz guitarists
Eight-string guitarists
Seven-string guitarists
American session musicians
Musicians from Portland, Oregon
American geologists
Hydrogeologists
People associated with nuclear power
Pupils of Gunther Schuller
Environmental engineers
University of Pittsburgh alumni
United States Army soldiers
People from Kittanning, Pennsylvania
People from Canby, Oregon
Deaths from kidney cancer
1929 births
2010 deaths
American jazz educators
Benny Goodman Orchestra members
Guitarists from Pennsylvania
Guitarists from Oregon
Guitarists from New York City
20th-century American guitarists
Jazz musicians from New York (state)
Jazz musicians from Pennsylvania
Scientists from New York (state)